Carlos Cardona (born 7 March 1974) is a Colombian internet entrepreneur best known for his Web 1.0 start-up Yupi Internet. He started his first company at the age of 18. His company went on to raise US$150 million from venture capitalists including Sony, Comcast and News Corp. Yupi was later sold to a joint venture between Microsoft and Telmex after the Dot-com bubble crash.

Internet entrepreneur
 Founder of several start-ups including Yupi Internet (Yupi.com) (later sold to Microsoft / Telmex) Now latino.msn.com
 Co-founder of Welltok Inc to be acquired by Virgin Pulse

Professional recognition
 Carlos Cardona, influential Hispanic for 2000 - HispanicBusiness.com
 Received both 1999 and 2000 Hispanic Entrepreneur Award “100 Most Influential Hispanics” by Hispanic Magazine, sponsored by IBM.
 Need an Internet Expert for Y2K? Carlos Cardona, Founder and CTO of Yupi.com Prnewswire.com
 Newsweek: Critical Mas: 20 For 2000
 Newsweek: Latin U.S.A.: How Young Hispanics Are Changing America
 Carlos Slim (Telmex) and Bill Gates (Microsoft) buy Yupi.com *Spanish
 Microsoft Press: Microsoft and Telmex Joint Venture, T1msn, to Acquire Yupi Internet
 Microsoft Press: Getting in the Head of 26,000 YupiMSN Users
 Microsoft Press: YupiMSN Introduces MSN Explorer in Spanish
 New York Times: Business; "What they are reading"

References

External links
 Carlos Cardona - personal web site

Colombian businesspeople
1974 births
Living people
Businesspeople in information technology